Frederick George Donnan CBE FRS FRSE (6 September 1870 – 16 December 1956) was a British-Irish physical chemist who is known for his work on membrane equilibria, and commemorated in the Donnan equilibrium describing ionic transport in cells.  He spent most of his career at University College London.

Life 
Donnan was born in Colombo, Ceylon, the son of William Donnan, a Belfast merchant, and his wife, Jane Ross Turnley Liggate. He spent his early life in Ulster. He was blind in one eye as the result of a childhood accident, and is often shown in profile. He studied at Queen's College, Belfast gaining a Bachelor of Arts degree in 1894, then at the University of Leipzig with Wilhelm Ostwald, resulting in a PhD in 1896, followed by research with J. H. van't Hoff. Donnan then became a research student at University College London, joining the academic staff in 1901.

In 1903 he became a lecturer on organic chemistry at the Royal College of Science, Dublin, followed a chair in physical chemistry at the University of Liverpool in 1906. In 1913 he returned to University College London, where he remained until his retirement, serving as Head of Department from 1928 to 1937.

He died in Canterbury on 16 December 1956. He was unmarried and had no children.

Work 
During the First World War, Donnan was a consultant to the Ministry of Munitions, and worked with chemical engineer K. B. Quinan on plants for the fixation of nitrogen, for compounds essential for the manufacture of munitions.  It was for this work that Donnan received the CBE in 1920. It was also during this period that he coined the word aerosol. He was said to have been "an early enthusiast for the new discipline of chemical engineering", and following the war was closely involved with the company Brunner Mond in the development of a major chemical works at Billingham.

Donnan's 1911 paper on membrane equilibrium was important for leather and gelatin technology, but even more so for understanding the transport of materials between living cells and their surroundings. It was on this so-called Donnan equilibrium that he frequently was asked to lecture across Europe and America, and is largely the only scientific research for which he is remembered today.  The Donnan equilibrium remains an important concept for understanding ion transport in cells.

Just before World War II, Donnan was active in helping European refugees wanting to flee from the Nazis.  Among those he assisted were Hermann Arthur Jahn and Edward Teller, who wrote their paper on the Jahn–Teller effect while in London.

Positions held 
Founder member of the Faraday Society and its president from 1924–6.

Fellow of the Chemical Society and President 1937-39

President of the British Association of Chemists 1940-41

Honours 
 1911 – Fellow of the Royal Society
 1920 – CBE for wartime services
 1924 – Longstaff Medal of the Chemical Society
 1928 – Davy Medal
 1936 – Fellow of the Royal Society of Edinburgh
 Donnan received 11 honorary degrees.

References

External links 
 

1870 births
1956 deaths
Irish physical chemists
People from Colombo
Commanders of the Order of the British Empire
Alumni of Queen's University Belfast
Academics of University College London
Academics of the University of Liverpool
Fellows of the Royal Society
Aerosol scientists